Gordon Lindsay Bruce (9 May 1930 – 9 January 1995) was an Australian politician. He was a Labor member of the South Australian Legislative Council from 1979 to 1993. From 1989 to 1993 he was President of the Council.

References

1930 births
1995 deaths
Members of the South Australian Legislative Council
Place of birth missing
Australian Labor Party members of the Parliament of South Australia
20th-century Australian politicians
Presidents of the South Australian Legislative Council